Suzann Pettersen (born 7 April 1981) is a retired Norwegian professional golfer. She played mainly on the U.S.-based LPGA Tour, and was also a member of the Ladies European Tour. Her career best world ranking was second and she held that position several times, most recently from August 2011 until February 2012. She retired on 15 September 2019 after holing the winning putt for the European team at the 2019 Solheim Cup, notwithstanding that she had been away from golf for almost 20 months on maternity leave prior to the event.

Amateur career
Pettersen was born in Oslo, Norway. Both her parents, Axel and Mona, participated in sports. She has two brothers, Stefan and Gunerius. Suzann Pettersen is a distant relative of merchant Gunerius Pettersen (1826–1892).

As an amateur, Pettersen was a five-time Norwegian Amateur Champion (1996–2000), and won the Girls Amateur Championship in 1999. She represented Norway in the world amateur team championship for women, the Espirito Santo Trophy in 1998 and 2000, finishing as the leading individual in her second appearance. Pettersen also represented Europe in the 1997 and 1999 Junior Ryder Cup Matches.

Professional career

2001
Pettersen turned professional in September 2000 at age 19 and gained her Ladies European Tour card with an 11th-place finish at the 2001 LET Qualifying School. In her 2001 rookie season, she played in ten events without missing a cut. In her second start as a professional, Pettersen won the Open de France Dames in a playoff over Becky Morgan. She finished second on the Order of Merit and was named LET Rookie of the Year.

2002
Pettersen started 2002 with a playoff loss to Karrie Webb in the AAMI Australian Women's Open, and two more top ten finishes led to her winning a place on the European team for the 2002 Solheim Cup. In the singles, Pettersen was five down with five to play and ended up with a tie against Michele Redman. She tied for 10th at the LPGA Final Qualifying Tournament to earn exempt status for the 2003 LPGA season.

2003
In 2003, Pettersen played in five events on the LET, missing no cuts and finished runner-up to Sophie Gustafson at the HP Open. She played a full rookie season on the LPGA, with her best finish a third place at the Chick-fil-A Charity Championship. Pettersen was a captain's pick for the 2003 Solheim Cup and recorded a 4–1–0 record as a member of the victorious European Team.

2004
In 2004, Pettersen played in just four events on the LET, with a best finish of T9 at the Evian Masters. On the LPGA, she began her season late after recuperating from elbow surgery. Pettersen recorded four top-10 finishes including a season-best tie for fifth at the State Farm Classic.

2005
In 2005, Pettersen played in only three events on the LET and nine events on the LPGA because of a debilitating back injury. When she returned, her best LPGA finish was a sixth at the John Q. Hammons Hotel Classic, and she finished tied for second at the Ladies Finnish Masters on the LET. Pettersen registered a 2–0–2 record as a captain's pick on the European Solheim Cup Team, and played for the International team at the inaugural Lexus Cup.

2006
In 2006, Pettersen played five times on the LET, recording two top ten finishes, including a third place at the Scandinavian TPC. On the LPGA Tour she had three top ten finishes, with a season's best finish fifth at the Florida's Natural Charity Championship.

2007
At the start of 2007, Pettersen was selected to represent Norway at the Women's World Cup of Golf but withdrew due to illness before the event started. At the Safeway International she recorded her then-best finish on the LPGA Tour, second place, two strokes behind Lorena Ochoa. A late collapse at the Kraft Nabisco saw her equal that finish, her second best at a major. Pettersen became the first Norwegian LPGA winner at the 2007 Michelob ULTRA Open at Kingsmill, beating Jee Young Lee in a playoff. Pettersen followed up this win by capturing the second major championship of 2007, the LPGA Championship, by one stroke over Karrie Webb, which moved her up to fourth in the Women's World Golf Rankings. On the Ladies European Tour she won the SAS Masters in her native Norway. In October at the Longs Drugs Challenge, Pettersen won her third LPGA victory, beating Lorena Ochoa in a playoff and then claimed wins number four and five in Korea and Thailand. On 31 December 2007, she reached the number two position in the Women's World Golf Rankings, surpassing Karrie Webb and Annika Sörenstam, trailing only Lorena Ochoa.

2008
In January 2008, Pettersen signed a multi-year agreement with Nike Golf to represent Nike in clubs, balls, footwear, glove and bag. Her first win of 2008 came at the rain-shortened Deutsche Bank Ladies Swiss Open.

2009
In September 2009, Pettersen won her sixth LPGA Tour event and first in two years at the CN Canadian Women's Open at Priddis Greens Golf & Country Club in Calgary, Alberta. Pettersen won the event by five strokes over Karrie Webb, Momoko Ueda, Morgan Pressel, Ai Miyazato and Angela Stanford.

2010
Pettersen was a runner-up six times on the LPGA Tour in 2010, but did not record a victory.

2011
Pettersen broke her 20-month victory drought in May, when she captured the Sybase Match Play Championship at Hamilton Farm Golf Club in New Jersey. Playing in cool, rainy conditions, she won all six of her 18-hole matches over four days, and defeated, among others, then-world number one Yani Tseng in the quarter-finals, and Cristie Kerr in the finals. In early August, Pettersen won the Ladies Irish Open on the LET with a 198 (-18), six shots clear of the field. It was Pettersen's first victory on the LET in 3 years, her last was the same tournament in 2008, played at Portmarnock Links. In her next start two weeks later, Pettersen won again on the LPGA Tour at the Safeway Classic in Oregon. She came from nine shots back at the start of the final round and shot a 64 (-7) to force a playoff against second round leader Na Yeon Choi.  Pettersen won on the first extra hole with a par after Choi put her approach shot in the water to double bogey. The victory moved her world ranking up to No. 2, ahead of Cristie Kerr and behind only Yani Tseng.

2012
Pettersen won twice in October on the LPGA Tour 2012, both in Asia.

2013
In March 2013, Pettersen won the Mission Hills World Ladies Championship. In April, she won the LPGA Lotte Championship. In September, she won the Safeway Classic, then The Evian Championship. In October, Pettersen won her fourth event of the LPGA Tour season when she captured the Sunrise LPGA Taiwan Championship.

2015

Pettersen wos involved in a controversy at the 2015 Solheim Cup match in St. Leon-Rot, Baden-Württemberg, Germany, in the second day afternoon four-ball match between Pettersen and Charley Hull for Europe against Alison Lee and Brittany Lincicome, United States. On the 17th green, with the match all square, Lee missed a putt to win the hole. Taking for granted that the next 18-inch putt was conceded, Lee picked up her ball. However, Pettersen pointed out that it was not conceded, and the Europeans won the hole. The European team captain Carin Koch and vice captain Annika Sörenstam tried to convince Pettersen to change her mind and concede the putt, but as it was a fact that Lee had picked up her ball without the putt being given to her, it wasn't a possibility within the rules of golf, for the players to agree on the outcome of the hole and change the sequence of events afterwards. Pettersen/Hull eventually won the match and Europe took a 10–6 lead going into singles. However, United States won the Solheim Cup after a strong come back during the singles play the last day of the match.

2017
For the 2017 the Solheim Cup match, 18–20 August in West Des Moines, Iowa, United States, Pettersen qualified for the team by her Women's World Golf Rankings, and should have made her 9th consecutive appearance, but withdrew with a back injury. European team captain Annika Sörenstam had previously named Catriona Matthew an assistant captain, but replaced her with Pettersen and nominated Matthew as a player instead.

2019
Pettersen was picked for the 2019 Solheim Cup European team by captain Catriona Matthew, who was criticized for choosing a player who had been away from golf for nearly two years on maternity leave. Pettersen had played only two events before Matthew chose her and missed the cut in both. At the time, Pettersen was ranked 620th in the world. That pick proved to be astute, as, on 15 September 2019, Pettersen holed her birdie putt on the 18th in her singles match at Gleneagles PGA Centenary Course to defeat Marina Alex, 1 up, to win the Solheim Cup for Europe.

Almost immediately after making the putt, the 38-year-old Pettersen announced that she'd no longer play professional golf. "I think this is a perfect closure," Pettersen said. "A nice 'the end' for [my] professional career. It doesn't get any better." Pettersen retired having won 15 times on the LPGA Tour, including two majors: the 2007 Women's PGA Championship and the 2013 Evian Championship. "Life's changed so much for me over the last year," Pettersen said. "He's [son Herman] obviously the biggest thing that's ever happened for me. But now I know what it feels like to win as a mom. I'm going to leave it like that."

2021
On 29 November 2021, Pettersen was announced as the 2023 European Solheim Cup captain.

Professional wins (21)

Ladies European Tour wins (7)

LPGA Tour wins (15)

LPGA Tour playoff record (5–3)

Major championships

Wins (2)

Results timeline
Results not in chronological order before 2015.

^ The Evian Championship was added as a major in 2013

CUT = missed the half-way cut
WD = withdrew 
T = tied

Summary

Most consecutive cuts made – 11 (2010 Kraft Nabisco – 2012 U.S. Open)
Longest streak of top-10s – 5 (2014 British – 2015 WPC)

LPGA Tour career summary

 Official through the 2019 season

* Includes matchplay and other events without a cut.

LET career summary

 Career LET earnings are €1,209,331 (through 2012), includes LPGA co-sanctioned events

World ranking
Position in Women's World Golf Rankings at the end of each calendar year.

Team appearances
Amateur
European Girls' Team Championship (representing Norway): 1997
Espirito Santo Trophy (representing Norway): 1998, 2000 (individual winner)
European Ladies' Team Championship (representing Norway): 1999
Junior Ryder Cup (representing Europe): 1997, 1999 (winners)

Professional
Solheim Cup (representing Europe): 2002, 2003 (winners), 2005, 2007, 2009, 2011 (winners), 2013 (winners), 2015, 2019 (winners)
Lexus Cup (representing International team): 2005 (winners), 2007, 2008 (winners)
Wendy's 3-Tour Challenge: 2009 (winners)

Solheim Cup record

See also
List of golfers with most LPGA major championship wins
List of golfers with most LPGA Tour wins

References

External links

Norwegian female golfers
LPGA Tour golfers
Ladies European Tour golfers
Winners of LPGA major golf championships
Solheim Cup competitors for Europe
Olympic golfers of Norway
Golfers at the 2016 Summer Olympics
Golfers from Orlando, Florida
Sportspeople from Oslo
1981 births
Living people